The Golden Bell Award for Best Directing for a Television Series is one of the categories of the competition for the Taiwanese television production, Golden Bell Awards. It has been awarded since 1980.

Winners

2000s

2010s

2020s

References

Directing for a Television Series, Best
Golden Bell Awards, Best Directing for a Television Series